Bolić is a Croatian surname, derived from the word bol, meaning "pain, ache". It may refer to:

Dražen Bolić (born 1971), Serbian footballer
Elvir Bolić (born 1971), Bosnian footballer
Zlatko Bolić (born 1974), Serbian basketball player

See also
Balić, surname
Belić, surname
Bilić, surname
Bulić, surname

Bosnian surnames
Serbian surnames